The Jaci Paraná River is a river of Rondônia state in western Brazil.
It is a tributary of the Madeira River, which it joins at Jaci Paraná in the municipality of Porto Velho, Rondônia

Tributaries of the Jaci Paraná river basin rise in the  Guajará-Mirim State Park, created in 1990.
The river forms the western boundary of the  Jaci Paraná Extractive Reserve, created in 1996.

See also
List of rivers of Rondônia

References

Sources

Rivers of Rondônia